The Academic Bowl is an annual rivalry football game and trophy between the Spartans of Case Western Reserve University and Tartans of Carnegie Mellon University.

Predating the Academic Bowl trophy name, Carnegie Tech first played Case Tech in 1907 and Western Reserve in 1909, meeting up multiple times over the next few decades.  Upon the merger of Case Tech and Western Reserve, the match-up resumed in 1970.  It was not until 1986 when the Academic Bowl was officially created.  The match-up mirrors the sports rivalry between the two cities of Cleveland and Pittsburgh.

The Academic Bowl emphasizes “Commitment to Academic and Athletic Excellence,” as both universities are often ranked scholastically among the top in the nation, especially as research universities.

Coach Rich Lackner has coached every game for Carnegie Mellon, achieving an 19–15 record. For Case Western Reserve, Coach Greg Debeljak carries a 10–8 record, including the longest winning streak at eight games.

Game results

See also
 Browns–Steelers rivalry

References

College football rivalry trophies in the United States
 Case Western
Carnegie Mellon Tartans football